Search: WWW is a 2019 South Korean television series starring Im Soo-jung, Lee Da-hee, Jeon Hye-jin, Jang Ki-yong, Lee Jae-wook, and Ji Seung-hyun. It aired on tvN from June 5 to July 25, 2019.

Synopsis
The story of three women in their late thirties — Bae Ta-mi, Cha Hyeon and Song Ga-kyeong — who work in the top two competitive web portal companies: Unicon and Barro.

Cast

Main
 Im Soo-jung as Bae Ta-mi (Tammy, 38 years old)
 She is a director of search department of Unicon, the top web portal company. She is smart, talented, intellectual, goal-oriented, determined and a person of high morals. Later, she joins Barro after being fired by Unicon. She is a workaholic and has no time for dating, nor does she intend to get married. She falls for Park Mo-gun after running across him several times.
 Lee Da-hee as Cha Hyeon (Scarlett)
 She is the social director of Barro (Unicon's rival company). She seems tough from outside, but has a very warm and kind heart. She is a former Jujitsu player and is very good at Jujitsu. Her only goal is to become super rich so that she can pay for medical expenses after beating anyone she feels like. She falls for Seol Ji-hwan.
 Jeon Hye-jin as Song Ga-kyeong
 The director of Unicon. She was once in good terms with Ta Mi. She is also a senior in school to Cha Hyeon. Initially she was from a conglomerate family. Her family used to own a battery business. She married Oh Jin-woo for business reasons and it is solely a contractual marriage. But her family went bankrupt, leading her to become a puppet of her mother-in-law. She dated Han Min-gyu for a while.
 Jang Ki-yong as Park Mo-gun/ Park Morgan (28 years old)
 He is the CEO of Millim Sound company. He is born to a Korean parents but was abandoned in his childhood and later he was adopted by an Australian couple. Mo-gun meets Bae Ta Mi at an arcade and they have a one night stand. He has a collaboration with Unicon's video games department. Mo-gun meets Ta-mi again at Unicon and eventually falls for her.
 Lee Jae-wook as Seol Ji-hwan.
 An aspiring actor who is quite neglected and remains unacknowledged by the film industry. He becomes acquainted with Cha Hyeon after an unfortunate accident. He plays the roles of villains in dramas but, in real life, he is kind, introverted and warm-hearted. He falls for Cha Hyeon.
 Ji Seung-hyun as Oh Jin-woo.
 Youngest son of KU group's chairwoman Jang He eun. He is despised by his mother a lot. He is a movie director and producer by profession. Jin-woo is also the husband of Unicon's director Song Ga-kyeong. He has affairs with numerous women behind his wife's back. But deep inside, he truly cares for Ga-kyeong, though his marriage with Ga-kyeong appears to be contractual solely for business purposes.

Supporting

People at Barro
 Kwon Hae-hyo as Min Hong-joo (Brian)
 He is the CEO of Barro. He is always protective of company's employees. 
 Kim Nam-hee as Pyo Joon-soo (Matthew)
 The Director of Gaming Department in Barro - A total womaniser. He dated Bae Ta Mi when they were in their early twenties. He is dating Cha Hyeon and Yoon Dong Joo simultaneously.
 Woo Ji-hyun as Choi Bong-gi (Joseph)
 He used to work at Unicon but, he left and followed Bae Ta Mi to Barro. He works for Barro Service Care team.
 Oh Ah-yeon as Jo Ah-ra (Ellie)
 She is a capable and talented woman. She used to work at Unicon's cafe. She followed Bae Ta Mi as well. She works for Service care team as well.
 Ha Seung-ri as Hong Yoo-jin (Jenny)
 She is the senior manager of Development Team. She is more fluent in programming than in any language. She is also a member of Service Care team led by Bae Ta Mi
 Song Ji-ho as Choi Jeong-hoon (Alex)
 He is the senior manager of Marketing Team of Barro. Chae Hyun's assistant and member of Service Care team.

Others
 Yoo Seo-jin as Na In-kyeong.
 CEO of Unicon. She is a corrupted and power seeking woman.
 Tak Woo-suk as Kim Seon-woo.
 He is an employee of Park Mo-gun. He works at Millim Sound.
 Han Ji-wan as Jeong Da-in.
 A pianist and a friend of Ta Mi. She returned to Korea after living in Germany for 10 years. Later, it turns out that she was the first love of Park Morgan. They meet again at a school reunion. And later, decided to have a business collaboration between them.
 Lee Ji-ha as Park Morgan's biological mother.
 She abandoned Park Morgan at a very young age and remarries to have a family.
 Jo Hye-joo as Yoon Dong-joo.
 An online blogger. She is the young girlfriend of Matthew's (Pyo Joon Soo). She is in her twenties.
 Ye Soo-jung as Jang Hee-eun.
 Song Ga kyung's mother in law and Oh Jin Woo's mother. She is the chairwoman of KU Group. She is quite corrupted and works as a slave to the President.
 Byeon Woo-seok as Han Min-gyu.
 He is a model and an actor who is sponsored by Director Song Ga-Kyung. He dated director Song Ga-kyung for a while.

Special appearances
 Son Jong-hak as Seo Myeong-ho (Ep. 1)
 Presidential Candidate.
 Choi Jin-ho as Joo Seung-tae (Ep. 1–2)
 A corrupted politician; Assemblyman.
 Yoon Ji-on as Team manager
 Jiho as Cha Hyeon's senior in high school (Ep. 6)
 Lee Tae-ri as webtoon artist Godori (Ep. 7)
 Lee Dong-wook as Ta-mi's ex-boyfriend (Ep. 7)
 He worked at Barro for 6 months and is getting married.
 Seo Woo-jin as Kidnapped child
 The child who was being kidnapped.

Production
The first script reading was held on February 22, 2019, with the attendance of the cast and crew.

The series is the debut of Kwon Do-eun as head writer after working as an associate to Kim Eun-sook.

Original soundtrack

Part 1

Part 2

Part 3

Part 4

Part 5

Part 6

Part 7

Viewership

Awards and nominations

References

External links
  
 
 

TVN (South Korean TV channel) television dramas
Korean-language television shows
2019 South Korean television series debuts
2019 South Korean television series endings
South Korean romance television series
South Korean melodrama television series
Television series by Studio Dragon
Television series by Hwa&Dam Pictures
South Korean workplace television series